The Cartercar was an American automobile manufactured in 1905 in Jackson, Michigan, in 1906 in Detroit, and from 1907 to 1915 in Pontiac, Michigan.

History

After leaving the Jackson Automobile Company due to a disagreement with his business partners over the choice of transmissions in 1905, Byron J. Carter formed the Motorcar Company in Jackson.  The firm relocated to Detroit by the end of the year, due to having financing there.  Starting in 1907, the company was named Cartercar Company and was relocated to Pontiac, thereupon merging with the makers of the Pontiac High wheeler. The Cartercar was given a warm reception in the press, largely due to the friction drive transmission, which was a sort of forerunner of the CVT of today, as both offered an infinite number of engine speeds.  At 4,000 miles, the paper fiber rims that were part of the friction-drive could be replaced for no more than  US$5 ($ in  dollars ), which was less than half the price that would be expended on grease packing in a regular geared transmission.

Sale to General Motors

Sales more than doubled between the first and second full years of production, from 101 in 1906 to 264 in 1907.  The next year sales were up again, now at 325. On October 26, 1909 Cartercar was bought by General Motors in the acquisition spree that William Durant went on after founding GM.  In explaining the reason he purchased Cartercar, Durant said:
"They say I shouldn't have bought Cartercar.  Well, how was anyone to know that Carter wasn't to be the thing?  It had the friction drive and no other car had it.  How could I tell what these engineers would say next?"

Durant lost control of GM in 1910, and by the time he had regained control in 1915, the GM board had already decided to discontinue the Cartercar, largely because sales never approached the 1000-2000 annually that Durant had predicted.  The GM board decided to use the factory instead to produce the Oakland.

Powertrain
The company began with a flat-twin engine; this was used alongside vertical fours in the 1909 range of cars.  By 1910, four-cylinder engines were the sole motor available.  Two models, both pair-cast fours, appeared in 1912; the Model R was 4160 cc, while the Model S was 5437 cc.  Each had a single chain drive. Even though there were other friction-drive cars on the market at the time, such as Lambert, Metz, and Petrel, none of them lasted as long or were as famous as the Cartercar.

Death of Byron Carter
Tragedy struck when Byron Carter died in 1908 as a result of trying to start a stalled car; the crank kicked back and hit him in the jaw, causing gangrene which ultimately proved fatal.  Carter was a personal friend of Cadillac founder Henry Leland, and his unfortunate death prompted Leland to urge Charles Kettering's development of the Self-Starter (introduced in 1912), the first successful motor vehicle electric starting system, thus eliminating the dangerous crank.  An ad for the 1912 Cartercar states that it includes a self-starter.

Advertisements
Because its friction-drive transmission allowed selection of any ratio rather than having fixed gear positions, the Cartercar was advertised as "The Car of a Thousand Speeds."   Another ad touted "It's Hard to Improve a Cartercar."

See also
Brass Era car

Notes

References

External links
Website for Cartercar enthusiasts
Company history at RitzSite

1905 establishments in Michigan
Vehicle manufacturing companies established in 1905
Vehicle manufacturing companies disestablished in 1915
Defunct motor vehicle manufacturers of the United States
Motor vehicle manufacturers based in Michigan
Cars powered by boxer engines
Defunct companies based in Michigan
Pontiac, Michigan
1915 disestablishments in Michigan